Ágnes Primász (born 5 March 1980 in Dunaújváros) is a female water polo player from Hungary, who competed for her native country at the 2004 Summer Olympics in Athens, Greece.

Primász became top scorer with fourteen goals at the 2001 Women's European Water Polo Championship in Budapest, Hungary, where she claimed the title with the Hungary women's national team.

See also
 List of World Aquatics Championships medalists in water polo

References

External links
 

1980 births
Living people
Sportspeople from Dunaújváros
Hungarian female water polo players
Olympic water polo players of Hungary
Water polo players at the 2004 Summer Olympics
Water polo players at the 2008 Summer Olympics
20th-century Hungarian women
21st-century Hungarian women